Fartein Valen-Sendstad (15 June 1918 – 13 February 1984) was a Norwegian historian and museologist. He served as Director of Maihaugen in Lillehammer, Norway.

He was born 15 June 1918 in Kristiania (now Oslo), Norway. He attended Oslo Cathedral School and the University of Oslo cand.philol. (1947); PhD. (1965). He worked as curator of the Sandvig Collection at Maihaugen in Lillehammer from 1949. In 1964 he succeeded Sigurd Grieg as museum administrator. He also lectured at the Norges Landbrukshøgskole in Akershus.

He published the three-volume series Gudbrandsdalen gjennom tidene in cooperation with Sigurd Grieg. His main research contribution was on the history of agriculture in Norway.

References

1918 births
1984 deaths
Writers from Oslo
People educated at Oslo Cathedral School
University of Oslo alumni
Grini concentration camp survivors
20th-century Norwegian historians
Museologists